Ball Haye Green is an area of Leek in Staffordshire, England. The area was historically an estate in the township of Tittesworth.  It was developed as a suburb of Leek from the 1820s, when the Leek Building Society erected 42 houses between 1824 and 1829. The suburb was extended in the 20th century by the building of housing estates.

References 

Leek, Staffordshire